Vaiben Solomon (1798 – 21 June 1860) was a London Jew who, with his brother Emanuel Solomon, was transported for larceny to New South Wales in 1818. He had further brushes with the law but seized business opportunities and became quite prosperous. He and his brother were then joined by a contingent of brothers and sisters who made their mark in New South Wales and South Australian business and politics.

Early life, crime and punishment
Vaiben and his brother Emanuel Solomon were arrested at a boarding house in Northallerton on the evening of 16 October 1816, charged with having broken into a farm house and stealing a quantity of clothing, the property of Thomas Prest, some of which they had already sold. They were subsequently committed for trial at the Durham Assizes, which took place on 6 August 1817. They were found guilty of theft, but not of breaking and entering (which was then a capital offence) and sentenced to transportation for seven years. They were taken away to Woolwich, where they were incarcerated in a hulk named Justitia moored in the River Thames. They were taken aboard the Lady Castlereagh which around mid-December 1817 set sail for Australia, arriving at Port Jackson on 30 April 1818. Governor Macquarie would only allow thirty-nine prisoners to disembark, and ordered the captain to take the remaining 261 to Van Diemens Land, compensating the ship's owners for the change of plans. The two Solomon boys, who were among the latter contingent, were not model prisoners, and after committing a theft of clothes were on 3 March 1821 sent in irons to Newcastle, New South Wales for three years, shortly before its dismemberment as a penal settlement. The boys received their Certificates of Release in Sydney in August 1824.

Prosperity
The means by which Emanuel and Vaiben made their way from poor emancipists to relative affluence is by no means clear but must have been by a series of small-time trading and gradual accretion. But by July 1826 he was in a position to begin employing labour, having written to the authorities to have the convict David Myers assigned to him at his business in King Street, Sydney. By 1928 he had premises to let at 74 George Street, which may have fallen through, as the following year the two brothers were in partnership at that same address. They continued in partnership for over ten years, buying and selling whenever they could see a financial advantage. In 1831 Vaiben bought into the Jamieson subdivision.

In 1836 he opened a tailoring establishment in George Street, and in September that year purchased  of land in Brighton.
He maintained the partnership with his brother Emanuel, for a time acting as agents for the ship Nereus, and when Emanuel moved to Adelaide, acting as agents for each other. They owned the brig Dorset, which ferried goods and passengers between the two cities, often making the return trip in 30 days. They built the Queen's Theatre, Adelaide in 1840, just in time for the Depression brought about by Governor Grey's financial stringency following Governor Gawler's profligacy. The theatre, managed by John Lazar, folded after a year. As trade between the two colonies dried up, and with increased competition from rival brig Emma, relations between the two brothers became strained, Emanuel accusing Vaiben of insufficient zeal and lack of communication. In 1844 Emanuel made it to Sydney to confront Vaiben; they dissolved partnership. Coincidentally, and largely due to the opening of copper mines in Burra and Kapunda, the economy of South Australia rebounded and Emanuel, who had by virtue of the strictest economy, retained most of his assets, profited hugely in partnership with his young nephew Judah Moss Solomon; his shares in the South Australian Mining Association repaid him handsomely.

Vaiben did not reach quite the same peak of wealth and prestige, but he was still hugely wealthy, as evidenced by the wills of his spinster daughters. He and his sons David, Abraham and Saul, in partnership as V. Solomon and Sons, purchased in 1855 the  estate "Horningsea", near Liverpool, New South Wales, with its grand, but somewhat dilapidated, mansion, and renamed it Horningsea Park. Vaiben and his family lived there and ran the farm.
Vaiben withdrew from the partnership in April 1857. His sons continued as D., A. & S. Solomon; they left the district in 1872. During his life Vaiben accumulated a considerable portfolio of properties.

Family
Vaiben married Mary "Sarah" Smith (c. 1809 – 18 May 1879) in 1826.  He and some of his family were practising Jews; contributing to the building of the first synagogue in Sydney. Among their children were:
David Vaiben Solomon (1828 – 14 June 1909)
Abraham Vaiben Solomon (1832 – 26 May 1894)
Elizabeth Solomon (1833 – 4 October 1922) was buried at the Jewish Cemetery, Rookwood. She left her entire estate valued at £31,798 to her sister Hannah.
Saul Vaiben Solomon (1834 – 3 April 1911) married Anne May "Annie" Marlow ( – 29 May 1926) on 8 November 1871
Elizabeth May "Lily" Solomon (1875 – 28 July 1956) married L. A. Gideon ( – ), lived at Bondi
Moss (or Moses) Vaiben Solomon (9 January 1837 – 2 October 1915) married Gertrude Eliza (perhaps Elizabeth) White ( – ) on 6 December 1871.
Ernest George Vaiben Solomon (19 October 1872 – 8 August 1928) married Elizabeth Amelia "Lizzie" Wood (c. 1874 – 4 March 1898) on 16 June 1896. He married again, around 25 April 1900, to Clara E. J. Hayes ( – ), who was involved in the Mrs Alexander will case. He was a publican of Gladestone Hotel, Hunter's Hill; Moore Park View Hotel; Park View Hotel, Sydney; Bridge Hotel, Sydney; Hotel Clovelly.
Ruth Eliza Ellen Solomon ( – ) married Joshua Allott Burgess (1867 – 29 July 1926) on 8 March 1904
Edwin Arthur Vaiben Solomon (20 September 1877 – ), cabinetmaker, married Jessie Elizabeth Black (c. 1874 – 13 May 1951) on 4 March 1907, lived Liverpool NSW, contested his aunt Hannah's will.

Lance Vaiben Solomon (27 January 1913–1989),  a noted painter
Hannah Alexandra Solomon (c. 1840 – 7 October 1929) married Louis Alexander, a man some 30 years her junior in 1895, then divorced in 1907 after his flagrant infidelity, yet he sued her for continuation of his £200 p.a. allowance. Wealthy and eccentric, her £80,000 ($10–20 million in today's money) will was contested by nephew Edwin Solomon and widely (and sensationally) reported.

Sources
Solomon, David The crime and punishment of Emanuel and Vaiben Solomon  November 2007 accessed on-line 15 January 2016
Richards, E. S. (1975) The fall and rise of the brothers Solomon Journal of Proceedings of the Australian Jewish History Society, Vol VIII, Part 2, pp. 1–28.

References not yet accessed
Levi, J. S. and Bergman, G. F. J. (1974) Australian genesis – Jewish convicts and settlers 1778–1850 London: Robert Hale and Company, 360 pp.
Levi, J. S. (1976) The forefathers – a dictionary of biography of the Jews of Australia (1788–1830)

References 

History of New South Wales
Convicts transported to Australia
Australian Jews
1802 births
1860 deaths